This is a list of recordings that feature the sound of a Mellotron, a polyphonic tape-replay keyboard developed in the 1960s.

1-9

A

B

C

D

E

F

G

H

I

J

K

L

M

N

O

P

Q

R

S

T

W

References

External links
 Planet Mellotron - attempts to document every song featuring the Mellotron or a similar tape-replay keyboard

Mellotron